South Denmark Road Bridge is a covered bridge spanning Mill Creek in Denmark Township, Ashtabula County, Ohio, United States. The bridge, one of currently 16 drivable bridges in the county, is a single span Town truss design. Bypassed in 1975, the bridge still remains open to light traffic.

History
1895 – Bridge constructed.
1975 – Bridge bypassed.

Dimensions
Span: 
Length: 
Width: 
Height:

Gallery

See also
List of Ashtabula County covered bridges

References

External links
Ohio Covered Bridges List
Ohio Covered Bridge Homepage
The Covered Bridge Numbering System
Ohio Historic Bridge Association
South Denmark Road Covered Bridge from Ohio Covered Bridges, Historic Bridges

Covered bridges in Ashtabula County, Ohio
Bridges completed in 1895
Road bridges in Ohio
Wooden bridges in Ohio
Lattice truss bridges in the United States